Kojak may refer to:
Kojak, a 1973–1978 American crime drama TV series
Kojak (2005 TV series), an American television series and remake of the original 1973 series
Papa Kojak (born 1959), a Jamaican deejay, also known as "Kojak" or "Nigger Kojak"
Kojak (vehicle), a Bolivian military dune-buggy
Mal Kirk, English professional wrestler billed as Kojak Kirk in the 1970s
See also:
Kojaque (born 1995), Irish rapper